Donji Krčin is a village in the municipality of Varvarin, Serbia. According to the 2002 census, the village has a population of  351 people; the population further decreased to 274 people according to the 2011 census.

References

Populated places in Rasina District